Midlands Today is the BBC's regional television news service for the West Midlands. It was launched in 1964 and is presented by Mary Rhodes, Nick Owen, Elizabeth Glinka, Rebecca Wood and Shefali Oza.

Overview
Midlands Today is produced by BBC Midlands and broadcasts on BBC One seven days a week. The programme is produced and broadcast from the BBC studios in The Mailbox, Birmingham. Journalists are also based at newsrooms in Coventry, Shrewsbury, Stoke-on-Trent and Worcester.

The programme began on 28 September 1964, broadcasting from a small room in the Birmingham Register Office before moving to the custom-built Pebble Mill broadcasting centre in Edgbaston on 10 November 1971. It remained there until the studios closed on 22 October 2004 when the BBC Birmingham operations were switched to the current studios at The Mailbox.

Up until 1991, the programme also served the East Midlands, which has since received its own BBC regional news service. The programme's editorial area consists of the West Midlands, Warwickshire, Staffordshire, Shropshire, Herefordshire, Worcestershire and northern Gloucestershire (even though Gloucestershire is not formally within the Midlands, being in the South West England region - it is also covered by BBC Points West).

Midlands Today is broadcast from the Sutton Coldfield transmitter in the West Midlands and can be watched in any part of the UK on Sky, Freesat and in the rest of Europe via Astra 2E at 28.2° East (10788V 22000 5/6). The latest edition is also available to view again on the Midlands Today website and on BBC iPlayer.

On February 6, 2023, new studio upgrade was revealed resembling that of Studio B at Broadcasting House launched in June 2022. The upgrade brings the studio up to full HD capabilities for the first time.

On air
On weekdays, 3 breakfast bulletins air as part of BBC Breakfast at 26 minutes past the hour, between 6:26am and 8:26am.
A fifteen-minute lunchtime bulletin airs at 1:30pm, following the BBC News at One.
The main edition of Midlands Today is broadcast every weeknight between 6.30pm and 7.00pm.
The late night bulletin airs at 10.30pm on weeknights, following the BBC News at Ten.

Midlands Today also airs short early evening bulletins on Saturday and Sunday evenings, although times usually vary.
A late night bulletin is also broadcast on Sundays, following the BBC News at Ten.

Presenters

News anchors

Weather presenters

Past presenters
Former presenters have included Tom Coyne (presented the first episode from Pebble Mill studios in 1971),  Kay Alexander (the programme's longest serving presenter), Alan Towers (see below), Alastair Yates, David Davies, Richard Uridge, Sue Beardsmore (left to become the public space coordinator at The Mailbox), Nina Nannar (moved to ITN in 2001), Stuart Linnell, Matt Smith, Julian Worricker, Ashley Blake (who was sacked in August 2009 after a criminal court case), Suzanne Virdee (who abruptly left in 2012 after an undisclosed row with management), Steve Clamp (moved to Central ITV in 2005) and Jackie Kabler who is now a regular presenter on QVC UK. Olympic Gold medalist Denise Lewis DBE also guest presented sport briefly during 2005, as did Rob Curling in 2002.

Senior presenter Alan Towers' on-air departure in July 1997 (after 25 years) brought about one of the most controversial moments in the programme's history when he shared indignant views on BBC management, describing them as "pygmies in grey suits wearing blindfolds".

References

External links 

BBC Birmingham productions
BBC Regional News shows
1964 British television series debuts
1960s British television series
1970s British television series
1980s British television series
1990s British television series
2000s British television series
2010s British television series
2020s British television series
Television news in England